Beezy Bailey (born 21 July 1962 in Johannesburg, South Africa) is a South African artist who works in various media, including painting, sculpture, drawing, printmaking and ceramics. He has been a full-time artist for 30 years, with over 20 one-man shows in London, Johannesburg and Cape Town as well as numerous group shows around the world.

He received a fine art degree from Byam Shaw School of Art in London in 1986, after studying two years of life drawing and then a third in printmaking, painting and sculpture.

Bailey has a history of close collaboration with other artists - most famously musicians. He has done work with David Bowie, Brian Eno, Dave Matthews and Arno Carstens. In addition he has worked with photographers Adam Letch and Zwelethu Mthethwa and sculptor Koos Malgas.
In 1985 before getting his degree, Bailey worked together with Young British Artist, Lennie Lee creating sculptures in an empty warehouse in east London, UK.  
Bailey's work is represented in several art collections, including the David Bowie Art Collection.

Beezy Bailey is married with two children and lives seasonally in Cape Town and London.

Joyce Ntobe

Born of the frustration of "increasingly prevalent affirmative action",  Bailey submitted two artworks for a triennial exhibition.  One was with the traditional Beezy Bailey signature (rejected) the other signed Joyce Ntobe.  The latter now resides in the South African National Gallery as part of its permanent collection.  When the curator of the Gallery wanted to work on a paper about three black women artists, Joyce Ntobe being one, Bailey revealed the truth, causing a media scandal. !

See also
Feb 3, Rainbow Nation Peace Ritual
Red Jacket

External links
 Beezy Bailey's official website
 Report on 'Art for Africa' auction at Sotheby's
 Short bio of Beezy Bailey
 Beezy Bailey at the Everard Read Gallery

1962 births
South African artists
Living people
Alumni of the Byam Shaw School of Art